Lakhendra Kumar Raushan is an Indian politician from Bihar and a Member of the Bihar Legislative Assembly. Raushan won the Patepur Assembly constituency on the BJP ticket in the 2020 Bihar Legislative Assembly election.

References

Living people
Bihar MLAs 2020–2025
Bharatiya Janata Party politicians from Bihar
1980 births